Comișani is a commune in Dâmbovița County, Muntenia, Romania with a population of 5,355 people. It is composed of two villages, Comișani and Lazuri.

References

Communes in Dâmbovița County
Localities in Muntenia